Jim Parton is the author of several books, including Unreasonable Behaviour, The Bucks Stops Here and Playing Footsie. He also wrote a book with the popular minstrel Robbie Williams, entitled 'Let Me Entertain You.'

He used to be a fathers' rights activist and was chairman of FNF for five years and later editor of the charity's newsletter, McKenzie. Jim was a frequent spokesperson on family law issues in the UK media .

He now lives in Southern Poland where he is restoring a seventeenth-century former bishop's palace with his wife at Piotrowice Nyskie, near Nysa. He writes occasionally on the internet and for the press.

Further reading
 Jim Parton (2009) The Bucks Stop Here: Money talks and mine said 'goodbye' . Harriman House. 

Year of birth missing (living people)
Living people
Fathers' rights activists
British non-fiction writers
British male writers
Male non-fiction writers